The Gottlieb Institute is an independently funded medical research facility located in Colorado. It initially started as an evolutionary biology research institute, the GI now researches and treats issues relating to the fields of genetics, virology, and nanomedicine.

History 

The institute was conceived by and named after the founder, Leslie D. Gottlieb. Leslie David Gottlieb established the Gottlieb Genetic Biology Foundation dating back to 1959 with the aim of setting up an institute that could conduct genetic research in the agriculture field, but Leslie Gottlieb did not start the Gottlieb Institute until 1968. It was built in Colorado with contributions from investors of the Gottlieb Genetic Biology Foundation during Gottliebs last year at the University of Michigan. The location of the Institute was the founder's former residence, and was completed March 1969 as an independent research institute for genetic and biology studies.

Aims 

The Gottlieb Institute has been conducting independent research for more than forty years. Its aim is to promote unorthodox thinking and thereby generate groundbreaking approaches to problems. The GI endeavours to be a meeting place, a space for bold ideas and for communication that transcends boundaries.

Thanks to its networking, the GI functions as a worldwide knowledge platform for researching and discussing medical issues and making the results available to a broader public.

Directors of the GI 

 Leslie D. Gottlieb (1967–1983)
 David Gottlieb (1983–1993)
 Noah Aptekar (1993 - Current)

In 1983, Leslie Gottlieb stepped down as director with his son, David Gottlieb, taking his place as Director
During the following months the Institute widened its field of study to include human genetics, virology, and nanomedicine.
Noah Aptekar has headed up the Gottlieb Institute since 1993.

Contributions

The Leslie and Vera Gottlieb Research Fund in Plant Evolutionary Biology was established in 2006 to provide funds to graduate students to support both laboratory and field research in the evolutionary biology of plants native to western North America. This is a broad field that includes evolutionary and population genetics, systematics and phylogenetic studies, comparative analyses of development, and physiological and biochemical studies of plant adaptations. The Research Fund will provide an annual award of $5000.

The Research Fund will help many grad students initiate their own careers in science as well as providing new information and new ideas about plant evolution.

After Leslie Gottliebs death in 2006, Director Noah Aptekar oversaw the construction of the Leslie Gottlieb Wing. The wing was complete in 2009, and is currently used as the facilities outpatient wing.

References

External links 
 

Hospital buildings completed in 1968
Biomedical research foundations
Medical research institutes in the United States
1968 establishments in Colorado
Medical and health organizations based in Colorado
Medical and health foundations in the United States
Research institutes in Colorado